Thea Doelwijt (born December 3, 1938) is a Surinamese-Dutch writer.

Life 
Doelwijt's father was Surinamese and her mother was Dutch. She came to Suriname in 1961 where she worked as a journalist for the newspaper, Suriname. She was editor of the magazine, Moetete (1968–69). Doelwijt wrote two widely read novels, and in the 1970s and 1980s, she wrote many plays, musicals and cabaret acts, including A Fat Black Woman Like Me and Iris. She developed several important anthologies and wrote children's books. Doelwijt also contributed to the English-language anthology of Surinamese literature, Diversity is power (2007). As a writer-in-residence, Doelwijt developed major workshops in Suriname.

In 1974, she received the Governor Currie Prize. In 1982, after the December Murders, Doelwijt returned to the Netherlands, and became a full-time writer. In 1989, she received an award for her contribution to Surinamese culture. Since 1998, she has been a member of the Society of Dutch Literature. Doelwijt is a contemporary of Benny Ooft.

Selected works
 De speelse revolutie (1967)
 Met weinig woorden (1968)
 Wajono (1969)
 Kri! kra! Proza van Suriname (1972)
 Toen Mathilde niet wilde ... (1972)
 Land te koop, (1973)
 Geen geraas of getier (1974)
 Kainema de Wreker en de menseneters (1977)
 Rebirth in words (1981)
 Iris (1987)
 Op zoek naar Mari Watson (1987)
 Cora-o (1988)
 Diversity is power (2007)

Notes

References
 Michiel van Kempen, ‘Thea Doelwijt’. In: Kritisch Lexicon van de Moderne Nederlandstalige Literatuur, no. 49, May 1993. (Dutch language)
 Michiel van Kempen, Een geschiedenis van de Surinaamse literatuur. Breda: De Geus, 2003, deel II, p. 72-724, 736, 818-822, 920-921, 925, 1005-1006, 1020, 1184-1185, 1198, 1202-1203. (Dutch language)

External links
 Thea Doelwijt at Digital Library for Dutch Literature (in Dutch. De inspiratie van Sophie Redmond is available as free download)

1938 births
Living people
People from Den Helder
20th-century Dutch novelists
21st-century Dutch novelists
Surinamese women writers
Dutch women dramatists and playwrights
Surinamese journalists
Dutch magazine editors
Surinamese novelists
Dutch women novelists
Surinamese dramatists and playwrights
20th-century Dutch dramatists and playwrights
Dutch women children's writers
Surinamese women children's writers
21st-century Dutch women writers
20th-century Dutch women writers
Women magazine editors
21st-century Dutch dramatists and playwrights